Lee Thompson Young (February 1, 1984 – August 19, 2013) was an American actor who began his career as a teenager, playing the titular character on the Disney Channel television series The Famous Jett Jackson (1998–2001). As an adult, major roles included playing Chris Comer in the movie Friday Night Lights (2004) and Boston police detective Barry Frost on the TNT police drama series Rizzoli & Isles (2010–14).

Early life
Young was born in Columbia, South Carolina, the son of Velma Elaine (née Love) and Tommy Scott Young. He was in the second grade when his parents' marriage ended, and he went to live with his mother. At age ten, he portrayed Martin Luther King Jr. in a play called A Night of Stars and Dreams by Dwight Woods, and the Phillis Wheatley Repertory Theater of Greenville, South Carolina. It was then that Young decided he wanted to become an actor.

Career
Young moved to New York City in June 1996, but it was not until the next year that he auditioned for the part of Jett Jackson in The Famous Jett Jackson. He filmed the pilot and found out in June 1998 that the Disney Channel had picked up the show; it would go on to become a Disney Channel Original Movie in June 2001. Young also starred in Johnny Tsunami (1999), another Disney Channel Original Movie, as Sam Sterling. Although the movie was successful, he did not reprise the role in the sequel, Johnny Kapahala: Back on Board (2007).

After the cancellation of The Famous Jett Jackson, Young had guest spots in the CBS series The Guardian. He also had a part in the movie Friday Night Lights (2004), portraying Chris Comer, and a part in the Jamie Foxx movie Redemption: The Stan Tookie Williams Story (2004). Lee appeared on UPN's TV drama series South Beach, and he portrayed Victor Stone (known in DC Comics as Cyborg) in a fifth-season episode of the television series Smallville, in 2006; which character he reprised in the Season Six episode "Justice" (airdate January 18, 2007), and again in the Season Nine finale "Salvation" (airdate May 14, 2010).

Young appeared in the feature film Akeelah and the Bee (2006), playing Akeelah's brother Devon. He played National Guard rookie Delmar in The Hills Have Eyes 2 (2007). In 2009, Young played a cocky surgical intern in the hit comedy show Scrubs. It is revealed that his character had been overweight during childhood. The character becomes involved in a romance with one of the medical interns.

Young played the role of Al Gough, an FBI agent, in the ABC television drama FlashForward. He was written off the show in episode 7, when his character committed suicide to prevent the death of an innocent civilian. His last acting role was playing Barry Frost, partner of Jane Rizzoli (Angie Harmon) on the TNT drama Rizzoli & Isles, and he made an appearance on the Fox drama The Good Guys as the brother and business partner of an arms dealer.

Personal life
Young graduated with honors from the University of Southern California, where he majored in cinematic arts and was a member of the Kappa Alpha Psi fraternity. Young enjoyed writing and wrote the screenplay for the 2007 short film Mano.

Death
On August 19, 2013, Young failed to show up to film an episode of Rizzoli & Isles. Police were called to do a wellbeing check on him at his Los Angeles apartment, where he was found dead. His manager stated that the actor died by suicide. Police confirmed the cause of death as a self-inflicted gunshot wound. Young had been diagnosed with bipolar disorder, for which he had been taking medication, and had been suffering from depression before his death.

After funeral services at Inglewood Park Cemetery, Young was interred at Lakeview Memorial Garden, York, South Carolina.  A memorial service was held on the Paramount Studios lot.

Young's family launched the Lee Thompson Young Foundation in an effort to help remove the stigma surrounding mental illness.

Filmography

Accolades

References

External links

1984 births
2013 deaths
20th-century American male actors
21st-century American male actors
Male actors from South Carolina
African-American male actors
American male child actors
American male film actors
American male television actors
Male actors from Columbia, South Carolina
Suicides by firearm in California
USC School of Cinematic Arts alumni
People with bipolar disorder
2013 suicides
20th-century African-American people
21st-century African-American people